Pouria Gheidar (born February 3, 1988) is an Iranian footballer who plays for Pas Hamedan in the IPL.

Club career
Gheidar has played his entire career for Pas Hamedan.

 Assist Goals

References

1988 births
Living people
Pas players
Iranian footballers
Association football midfielders